The Northerns women's cricket team, also known as Titans Ladies and previously known as Northern Transvaal women's cricket team, is the women's representative cricket team for the South African region of Tshwane. They compete in the Women's Provincial Programme, which they have won three times, and the CSA Women's Provincial T20 Competition.

History
The side first appeared in the Simon Trophy, as Northern Transvaal, in the 1951–52 season and played in the tournament until 1959–60. As Northerns, they next competed in the Inter-Provincial Tournament in 1995–96, and have competed in the tournament ever since. They first won the tournament in 1998–99, beating North West in the final. They next won the tournament in 2010–11, finishing second in their group to qualify for the knockout stages before beating Boland in the semi-final and KwaZulu-Natal in the final. They retained their title the following season, going unbeaten in the group stages before beating KwaZulu-Natal in the semi-final. They then beat Western Province in the final by 161 runs, with Marizanne Kapp making 106.

They have also competed in the CSA Women's Provincial T20 Competition since its inception in 2012–13. They have finished as runners-up in the competition twice, in 2013–14 and 2015–16.

Players

Current squad
Based on squad announced for the 2021–22 season. Players in bold have international caps.

Notable players
Players who have played for Northerns and played internationally are listed below, in order of first international appearance (given in brackets):

  Patricia Klesser (1960)
  Anina Burger (1997)
  Cindy Eksteen (1997)
  Linda Olivier (1997)
  Karin Swart (1997)
  Yulandi van der Merwe (2000)
  Sunette Viljoen (2000) 
  Rozelle Scheepers (2000) 
  Hanri Strydom (2000)
  Cri-Zelda Brits (2002)
  Tamara Reeves (2002)
  Charlize van der Westhuizen (2003)
  Lonell de Beer (2005)
  Marcia Letsoalo (2007) 
  Mignon du Preez (2007) 
  Kirsten Blair (2007) 
  Dane van Niekerk (2009)
  Marizanne Kapp (2009)
  Melissa Smook (2011)
  Suné Luus (2012)
  Andrie Steyn (2014)
  Odine Kirsten (2016)
  Nadine de Klerk (2017)
  Robyn Searle (2018)
  Delmi Tucker (2022)

Honours
 CSA Women's Provincial Programme:
 Winners (3): 1998–99, 2010–11 & 2011–12
 CSA Women's Provincial T20 Competition:
 Winners (0):
 Best finish: Runners-up (2013–14 & 2015–16)

See also
 Northerns (cricket team)
 Titans (cricket team)

References

Women's cricket teams in South Africa
Cricket in Gauteng